Knowing Me Knowing You with Alan Partridge (also known as Knowing Me Knowing You) is a BBC Radio 4 series of six episodes (beginning 1 December 1992). It is named after the song "Knowing Me, Knowing You" by ABBA (Alan Partridge's favourite band), which was used as the show's title music.

Steve Coogan played the incompetent but self-satisfied Norwich-based host, Alan Partridge. Alan was a spin-off character from the spoof radio show On the Hour (which later transferred to TV as The Day Today). Originally airing at 18:30, Radio Times described the show as: "Classic chat from On the Hour's supreme sports reporter and his guests from the world of theatre, politics and emotional tragedy."

Episodes

Characters carried over into the TV series
Several characters from the radio series are similar to ones used in the TV series; several jokes are even reused. Doon MacKichan's character Kendall Ball did not make it into the eventual TV series but did appear in The Day Today, made between the two incarnations.

References

External links
BBC – Knowing Me Knowing You with Alan Partridge – The Radio Series
Knowing Me, Knowing You: Radio Show 1 (episode 1 transcript)
Knowing Me, Knowing You: Radio Show 3 (episode 3 transcript)

1992 radio programme debuts
1993 radio programme endings
BBC Radio comedy programmes
Radio programs adapted into television shows
Radio programs adapted into films
Radio programs adapted into novels